Angelicuss is the first Romanian LGBT magazine and is published by Be An Angel, an LGBT rights organisation from Cluj-Napoca. The magazine was initially only available through the internet, with the first print version released in November 2004 and distributed free of charge. In 2005, the magazine was replaced by Switch, also released by Be An Angel. In 2006, however, Switch was discontinued and replaced by a revamped Angelicuss, released in the format of a weekly newsletter. From June 2007, Angelicuss have too a daily update online version.

The editor of Angelicuss is Lucian Dunăreanu.

See also
List of magazines in Romania

External links
Angelicuss online magazine 
Angelicuss newsletter 

2004 establishments in Romania
Magazines established in 2004
Weekly magazines published in Romania
LGBT-related magazines
Magazines published in Romania
LGBT-related mass media in Romania
Romanian-language magazines